The Beretta Cheetah, also known by its original model name of "Series 81", is a line of compact blowback operated semi-automatic pistols designed and manufactured by Beretta of Italy. They were introduced in 1976 and include models in .32 ACP (Models 81 and 82), .380 ACP (9 mm Short) (Models 80X, 83, 84, 85 and 86) and .22 LR (Models 87, 87 Target and 89). Beretta still manufactures the Cheetah in Italy with limited imports to the U.S. each year.

Models

80X
An updated version of the model 84FS chambered for the .380 ACP (9 mm Short) cartridge introduced in 2023. The 80X has a Vertec grip, reshaped trigger guard, a Picatinny rail on the frame for accessories like a white light or laser, and an optics ready slide. It also has an improved adjustable trigger, an easier-to-rack slide with forward serrations, and lightened recoil from tuning of the slide weight and spring rates. The magazine is a new design as the pistol uses a redesigned feed ramp to make it feed more reliably with modern ammunition such as hollow points and can only be used with this pistol, while model 84 series magazines cannot be used.

81 and 82
These two models are chambered for the .32 ACP cartridge. The 81 has a double stacked magazine with 12 round capacity, while the 82 has a single stacked magazine with nine round capacity and resultant thinner grips.

83, 84 and 85 
These three models are chambered for the .380 ACP (9 mm Short) cartridge. The 84 has a double stacked magazine with 13 round capacity, while the 83 and 85 have a single stacked magazine with seven and eight round capacity respectively, and resultant thinner grips. The 84 and 85 have a 3.81" barrel, while the 83 has a 4" barrel.

86
The model 86 is chambered for the .380 ACP (9 mm Short) cartridge, but differs significantly from other models in the series, because it has a redesigned front end with a tip-up barrel that hinges at the muzzle to open the breech. This allows the shooter to load a cartridge directly into the chamber, and not have to operate the slide.

87
There are two distinct 87 models both chambered for .22 LR. The standard model is similar to other models, but the 87 Target has a longer barrel and slide, can accept optical sights, and is single action only.

89
The model 89 is also chambered for the .22 LR and is designed for competition and range training, with a lightweight frame and ergonomic grips.

Versions
There are potentially five versions for models 81 through 87. The features for each version in models 81, 82, 84 and 85 are consistent between models (i.e., the 81FS, 82FS, 84FS and 85FS all have similar features). This is not the case with models 83, 86, 87 and 89, which were not made in all versions.

Base versions (no letter suffix)
Base versions of models 81 through 87 are noted for having a rounded trigger guard and generally fewer safety features than subsequent versions. Safety is ambidextrous and frame mounted. The frame is alloy, the slide is blued steel and the standard grips are wood.

B versions
The B versions of models 81, 82, 84, and 85 introduced an automatic firing pin safety, a shorter extractor and grooved front and back straps.

BB versions
The BB versions of models 81, 82, 84 and 85 have more serrations on the slide, white dot and post sights and other subtle changes.

F versions
The F versions of models 81, 82, 84 and 85 introduced the "combat" trigger guard with a squared-off front that allows for a finger hold, plastic grips, a proprietary "Bruniton" finish, a chrome-plated barrel and chamber, and a combination safety and decocker lever.

FS versions
Current production models of .32 ACP and .380 ACP Cheetah pistols are in the FS configuration (e.g. 81FS). In models 81, 82, 84 and 85 they include internal improvements over the F versions that are not visible during casual inspection.

Recently (2014-2015) the 81FS, 84FS, and 85FS models have been available new for sale in the U.S. They are occasionally available in both the Bruniton and nickel finishes.

Browning BDA 380 & FN 140 DA

From 1977 to 1997 Beretta built the Browning BDA 380, which is essentially the model 84BB with a standard ejection port (instead of an open slide), a slide-mounted decocker/safety and a spur hammer. Production resumed in 2000 and continues through today (2015). During both periods mentioned Beretta also made the FN 140 DA, which is identical to the BDA 380 except for being marked "Fabrique Nationale" instead of "Browning". The 140 DA was also made in a .32 ACP version.

Users

  — since 2007 used as service pistol in private security companies

 — Model 85 is used by Drug regulator of Ministry of Health, Labour and Welfare

Gallery

Notes

External links

 Beretta 89 instruction manual in English
 Beretta 80X Beretta webpage

Beretta firearms
.22 LR pistols
.32 ACP semi-automatic pistols
.380 ACP semi-automatic pistols
Cheetah
Weapons and ammunition introduced in 1976